Cotto vs. Pinto was a boxing match between Miguel Cotto and Brazilian Kelson Pinto on September 11, 2004 in Hato Rey, Puerto Rico. The event was held for the vacant WBO junior welterweight title.  They had previously fought as amateurs they had met in the ring as amateurs, with Pinto beating the then 19-year-old Cotto. This fight was televised by HBO from San Juan, Puerto Rico.

Pinto figured he could out box and out smart the younger and shorter Cotto, after all he had beaten him before. This proved to be a fatal mistake, as Cotto, hungry and eager to seek revenge and also not let his home crowd down started out beautifully and in the second round Pinto was floored with a right to the chin followed by a vicious left hook to the side of the head. The crowd was ecstatic, but the brave Pinto got up the canvas and survived the round. Pinto, after realizing that he was facing a vast improved Cotto with deadly power in both hands decided he would have to box, keeping Cotto away using his long jab, it  worked well for most of the third and fourth rounds however Cotto would occasionally slip in a combination here and there.

The fifth round started out the same, and as Pinto's courage started to build up towards the end of the round he moved closer to Cotto and tried to trade with him. This proved to be fatal, and once again Cotto unloaded his artillery with at least five vicious punches including an upper cut that staggered the Brazilian, and on his way to the canvas Cotto's punching power and incredible speed would land one last punch as the Brazilian was dropped for the second time in the fight.

Saved by the bell Cotto did not waste any time when they came out for the sixth. He launched into full attack, landing a right hand to the jaw and unloading power punch after power punch against the helpless Brazilian who was trying hard to block punches to no success. One last left hook to the body dropped Pinto and referee Roberto Ramirez stopped the fight just as Pinto's corner was about to throw the towel.

References

Boxing matches
2004 in boxing
Boxing in Puerto Rico
Sports in San Juan, Puerto Rico
2004 in Puerto Rican sports